The 1977 European Formula Two season was contested over 13 rounds. Frenchman René Arnoux was the season champion, driving a Martini-Renault/Gordini for Ecurie Renault Elf.

Calendar

Note:

Race 3, 10 and 11 were held in two heats, with results shown in aggregate.

Race 6 originally scheduled over 73 laps, but stopped early due to heavy rain.

Race 3 and 4 was won by a graded driver, all graded drivers are shown in Italics

Final point standings

Driver

For every race points were awarded: 9 points to the winner, 6 for runner-up, 4 for third place, 3 for fourth place, 2 for fifth place and 1 for sixth place. No additional points were awarded.

Note:

Only drivers which were not FIA graded, were able to score points.

References

Formula Two
European Formula Two Championship seasons